Foreign relations exist between Armenia and  Lebanon. Lebanon is host to the eighth largest Armenian population in the world and was the first Arab League member state that recognized the Armenian genocide.

Aid
During the 2006 Lebanon War, Armenia announced that it would send humanitarian aid to Lebanon. According to the Armenian government, an unspecified amount of medicines, tents and fire-fighting equipment was allocated to Lebanese authorities on July 27, 2006.

Recognition of Armenian genocide 
On May 11, 2000, the Lebanese parliament voted to recognize the Armenian genocide. Lebanon was the first Arabic-speaking country to have done so.

Cultural relations
The vast Armenian community in Lebanon also has several political parties and is recognised as an institution in its own right with reserved seats in parliament. Tashnag is the largest Armenian party in Lebanon, currently in government, and sits with the March 8 alliance; however, there are also parties that are supportive of the opposition March 14 alliance.
Also, Armenia and Lebanon abolished Visa Requirements between both countries during the official visit of Armenia's President Serzh Sargsyan to Baabda Palace meeting there many Political Figures including President Michel Suleiman.

See also 
 Foreign relations of Armenia
 Foreign relations of Lebanon 
 Armenians in Lebanon
 Armenian diaspora in the Middle East

References 

 
Lebanon 
Bilateral relations of Lebanon